= Fazna Shakir =

Maldives politician

Personal details
- Born: Malé, Maldives
- Profession: Minister of State for Gender, Family and Social Services

Fazna Shakir is the Maldives Minister of State for Gender, Family and Social Services. She is also a council member of the Maldives Reform Movement.
